Marcin Krzywański (born 29 August 1975) is a retired Polish athlete who specialised in sprinting events. He won a bronze medal in the 4 × 100 metres relay at the 1998 European Championships.

Competition record

Personal bests
Outdoors
100m 10.23 (1998)
200m 21.11 (+0.6 m/s) (Łódź 2001)

Indoors
60m 6.53 (Valencia 1998)

References

1975 births
Living people
Polish male sprinters
World Athletics Championships athletes for Poland
European Athletics Championships medalists
Place of birth missing (living people)